Transcriptional adaptation is a recently described type of genetic compensation by which a mutation in one gene leads to the transcriptional modulation of related genes, termed adapting genes or modifiers.

References 

Gene expression